Guvas (also Romanized as Gūvās; also known as Govās, Govos, and Gūās) is a village in Hudian Rural District, in the Central District of Dalgan County, Sistan and Baluchestan Province, Iran. At the 2006 census, its population was 412, in 78 families.

References 

Populated places in Dalgan County